Neocollyris subtilis is a species of ground beetle in the genus Neocollyris in the family Carabidae. It was described by Chaudoir in 1863.

References

Subtilis, Neocollyris
Beetles described in 1863